Lieutenant-Colonel Sir John Dugdale Astley, 3rd Baronet (19 February 1828 – 10 October 1894) was an English soldier and sportsman.

Life
He was the son of the 2nd Baronet (created 1821) Sir Francis Dugdale Astley and wife Emma Dorothea Lethbridge, and a descendant of Lord Astley.

From 1848 to 1859, he was in the Scots Fusilier Guards, serving in the Crimean War and retiring as a Lieutenant-Colonel.

On 22 May 1858, he married an heiress, Eleanor Blanche Mary Corbett, of Elsham Hall, North Lincolnshire. Eleanor (died 7 June 1897) was the daughter of Thomas George Corbett (died 5 July 1868) and wife (married 15 December 1837) Lady Mary Noel Beauclerk (28 December 1810 – 29 November 1850), daughter of the 8th Duke of St Albans. He thereafter devoted himself to sports including horse racing, boxing and pedestrianism. He was a popular figure at horse race meetings, known familiarly as "the Mate", and for winning and losing large sums of money. Two famous jockeys that rode regularly for him were George Fordham and Charlie Wood.

He succeeded to the baronetcy in 1873. From 1874 to 1880 he was the Conservative Member of Parliament for North Lincolnshire, like his father in law before him.

Just before his death in October 1894, he published entertaining reminiscences under the title of Fifty Years of My Life. This contains the first recorded appearance of the phrase "like a duck to water" – I always took to shooting like a duck to water.

His descendants include Samantha Cameron, wife of former prime minister David Cameron.

See also
 Astley baronets

References

Attribution

Further reading

Newmarket Local History Society, Personalities from the Past: Sir John Dugdale Astley (1828 - 1894)

External links 

1828 births
1894 deaths
Baronets in the Baronetage of the United Kingdom
British Army personnel of the Crimean War
Conservative Party (UK) MPs for English constituencies
Scots Guards officers
UK MPs 1874–1880